Lutris is a free and open source game manager for Linux-based operating systems developed and maintained by Mathieu Comandon and the community, released under the GNU General Public License. 

For games that require using Wine, community installer scripts are available that automatically configure the Wine environment. Lutris also offers integration for software purchased from GOG, Humble Bundle, Steam, and Epic Games Store; those can be launched directly through the Lutris application. Additionally, Lutris supports over 20 emulators including DOSBox, ScummVM, MAME, Snes9x, Dolphin, PCSX2 and PPSSPP.

In 2013, when Steam support was first added to Lutris, OMG! Ubuntu! noted that the database of Lutris games had thus far been limited. They also noted that while it was possible to submit installers for the Lutris database, each addition needed to be manually approved by the Lutris development team.

History

Lutris began as a piece of software called Oblivion Launcher, which was created in 2009 by Mathieu Comandon. He wanted an easier way to manage his games running on Linux, especially the ones that ran using Wine. Lutris began development on Launchpad, with the repository being created on May 5th, 2009. The first public release, 0.1, was on November 29th, 2009. In 2010, development moved to GitHub.

References

See also
Wine
PlayOnLinux

2009 software
Free software programmed in Python
Linux emulation software
Multi-emulators
Software derived from or incorporating Wine